The Romanian-language surname Negru literally means "black" and may refer to:

Dan Negru, Romanian TV presenter and host
Natalia Negru, Romanian poet and writer
Nicolae Negru, Moldovan writer and journalist
Tudor Negru, Moldovan politician
Valentin Negru, Romanian football player

Others 
Radu Negru, Radu the Black, a  mythical early ruler of Wallachia
Râul Negru, river in Romania

Romanian-language surnames